Holly Gillibrand (born 2005) is a Scottish environmental activist. She is an organizer for Fridays for Future Scotland.  

She was named the 2019 Glasgow Times Young Scotswoman of the Year. She was also named one of 30 inspiring women on the BBC's Woman's Hour Power List 2020 and was interviewed on the show. Gillibrand has written for the Lochaber Times.

In August 2020, Gillibrand supported Chris Packham in a national campaign to stop wildlife crime. In November of that year, she and other youth activists had a Question and Answer session with Alok Sharma. She serves as a youth advisor for the charity Heal Rewilding, which aims to return more land to nature.

Along with other Scottish environmental activists, Gillibrand starred in the BBC Scotland film The Oil Machine (2022), which details the reliance of the United Kingdom on North Sea oil.

References 

Living people
People from Glasgow
Scottish environmentalists
Child activists
Youth climate activists
2005 births